David Lee Schneck (born June 18, 1949) is a former Major League Baseball outfielder. He played parts of three seasons, from 1972 until 1974, with the New York Mets.

Originally drafted as a pitcher by the Mets in 1967, he did not begin his professional career until 1968 due to a shoulder injury. He was converted into an outfielder, and he started 1968 with the rookie class Marion Mets. At 19, he was drafted into the army and served 14 months in the Vietnam War. After missing the 1969 and 1970 seasons while serving in the army, Schneck continued to progress through the minor leagues until 1972, when he made his major league debut.

After spending most of 1973 back in the minor leagues with the Tidewater Tides, Schneck got his longest shot at the majors in 1974. He played 93 games with the Mets that season, batting .205 with 5 home runs. However, that proved to be the end of his major league career.

Schneck went 2–11 at the plate on September 11, 1974, during a 25 inning marathon night game against the St. Louis Cardinals. Those 11 at-bats tied a major league record for most AB in an extra-inning game.

Schneck was traded along with Tug McGraw and Don Hahn from the Mets to the Philadelphia Phillies for Del Unser, John Stearns, and Mac Scarce at the Winter Meetings on December 3, 1974. He started the 1975 season with their top farm club, the Toledo Mud Hens, and on August 5 he was traded to the Cincinnati Reds for John Vukovich. He played with their top farm team, the Indianapolis Indians, until the end of the 1976 season. During that offseason, he was traded again, this time to the Chicago Cubs, for outfielder Champ Summers. After playing one more season in the minors, for the Wichita Aeros, Schneck retired. Schneck currently owns a company known as Schneck Waterproofing in Northampton, Pennsylvania.

Early life
Schneck graduated from Whitehall High School, where he was a pitcher.

References

External links

Dave Schneck at  Baseball Almanac
Dave Schneck at Ultimate Mets Database
Dave Schneck at Pura Pelota (Venezuelan Professional Baseball League)
Dave Schneck at Baseball Gauge

1949 births
Living people
American expatriate baseball players in Venezuela
Baseball players from Pennsylvania
Florida Instructional League Mets players
Indianapolis Indians players
Leones del Caracas players
Major League Baseball outfielders
Marion Mets players
Memphis Blues players
New York Mets players
Raleigh-Durham Mets players
Sportspeople from Allentown, Pennsylvania
Tidewater Tides players
Toledo Mud Hens players
United States Army personnel of the Vietnam War
United States Army soldiers
Visalia Mets players
Wichita Aeros players
Whitehall High School (Pennsylvania) alumni